Imaginism was a Russian avant-garde poetic movement that began after the Revolution of 1917.

History

Imaginism was founded in 1918 in Moscow by a group of poets including Anatoly Marienhof, Vadim Shershenevich, and Sergei Yesenin, who wanted to distance themselves from the Futurists; the name may have been influenced by imagism.

Stylistically, they were heirs to Ego-Futurism. Imaginists created poetry based on sequences of arresting and uncommon images. They wrote many verbless poems.

Other members of the group were the poets Rurik Ivnev, Alexander Kusikov, Ivan Gruzinov, Matvey Royzman, and the prominent Russian dramatist Nikolay Erdman. In January 1919 they issued a manifesto, whose text was largely written by Shershenevich.

Most of the imaginists were freethinkers and atheists. Imaginism had its main centres in Moscow and St. Petersburg. There were also smaller centres of imaginism in Kazan, Saransk, and Ukraine. Imaginists organised four poetry publishing houses, one of which was called simply Imaginism, and published the poetry magazine Gostinitsa dlya puteshestvuyuschih v prekrasnom ("Guesthouse for travellers in the beautiful").

The group broke up in 1925, and in 1927 it was liquidated officially. Its heritage, though, is still strong in Russia. Poems by Yesenin and Shershenevich, memoirs by Marienhof, and plays by Erdman are still in print and always in demand.

After the disappearance of the group, the "young imaginists" declared themselves followers of this trend in the early 1930s, and so did the "meloimaginists" of the 1990s.

Literature 

 Markov, V. Russian Imaginism 1919-1924. Gießen 1980.
 Nilsson, N. The Russian imaginists. Ann Arbor: Almgvist and Wiksell, 1970.
 Huttunen, T. Imazhinist Mariengof: Dendi. Montazh. Ciniki. Moscow: NLO, 2007.
 Ponomareff, C. "The Image Seekers: Analysis of Imaginists Poetic Theory, 1919-1924." The Slavic and East European Journal 12 (1986).
 Kudryavitsky, A. "Popytka zvuka." Novoe literaturnoe obozrenie 35 (1999).

See also
Verbless poetry

Notes

External links
Russian Imaginism

Russian poetry
Literary movements